Climate change in Jordan has serious impacts on the water resources in Jordan. The country needs to prepare for the impacts of climate change. Water resources in Jordan are scarce. Besides the rapid population growth, the impacts of climate change are likely to further exacerbate the problem. Temperatures will increase and the total annual precipitation is likely to decrease, however with a fair share of uncertainty. Hence, existing and new activities with the objective to minimize the gap between water supply and demand contribute to adapt Jordan to tomorrow's climate. This might be accompanied by activities improving Jordan's capacity to monitor and project meteorological and hydrological data and assess its own vulnerability to climate change.

Impacts on the natural environment

Temperature and weather changes 
Most of Jordan's territory is classified as desert. Summers are generally hot and dry, while winters can be cold in some areas. The annual rainfall varies from little more than 30 mm in desert areas up to 572 mm in the hilly northwest of Jordan. Almost all precipitation falls between October and May. In the Jordan Valley, winters are mild and summers very hot, with very little rainfall throughout the year.

Jordan's Second National Communication includes a chapter on observed and projected climate change in the country. Concerning the past, data for the period 1961-2005 (or shorter in some cases) of 19 meteorological stations all over Jordan were evaluated with the following results:

 The minimum temperature increased by 0.4-2.8 °C, the maximum temperature by 0.3-1.8 °C.
 13 stations show a decreasing total annual precipitation by 5-20%. Six stations experienced an increase by 5-10%.
 The number of rainy days decreased by 3-10% in most of the stations
 In most stations, relative humidity decreased while evaporation increased

Another study comes to similar results. Using data from the last 30–83 years from six meteorological stations in Jordan, the minimum temperature increased while the maximum temperature did not change significantly. Concerning total annual precipitation however, no visible changing trends are visible.

The collected data from the 19 stations served as a baseline and were compared to baselines extracted from 13 General Circulation Models (GCMs), which are coarse models used by the Intergovernmental Panel on Climate Change in order to project climate change at the global level. The three GCMs whose grid points correlated most with the study area were then used to project the climate for the period 2005-2050. The results are the following:

 All models project a temperature increase by about 1-1.3 °C by 2050. Warming is projected to be stronger in the summer months.
 Concerning precipitation, the models do not agree. One model projects an increase in precipitation from October to May and a decrease in summer. Another model projects a decrease from November to April and the third model projects more rain in the months February to May and December and less rain in all other months.

The Second National Communication repeatedly addresses the limitations which were encountered during the preparation of the climate projections. Besides the uncertainties caused by the low resolution of GCMs and unclear emission developments, observational records were reported to be incomplete. Data in daily and monthly time series were missing in most meteorological stations. Moreover, the quality of available water data is described as partly inappropriate. According to the communication,
“the existing climatic and water resources monitoring in the country is facing permanent problems in operation, slow modernization of equipment and reducing of the monitoring network”.

The World Bank Climate Change Data Portal shows results which are similar to those of the Second National Communication. Five locations in different parts of Jordan (figure 1) were picked. Climate change for the period 2030-2049 was projected by several GCMs. The tool shows the number of GCMs agreeing in the direction of change, as shown in the table below.

According to the data portal, temperature is projected to increase in all locations. Precipitation is projected to decrease in all locations by most models, but there is a certain uncertainty in Amman, Aqaba and Ma’an, where about three quarters of the models agree. Precipitation intensity is projected to increase by at least three quarters of the models in all locations. The results concerning consecutive dry days are completely uncertain with half of the models projecting more and the other half less consecutive dry days. There seems to be an error concerning runoff, since the data portal shows impossible data concerning uncertainty.

To conclude, the most obvious development is an increase in temperatures. The total annual precipitation might decrease, but there is a significant share of uncertainty. Precipitation intensity is likely to increase. The trend of droughts is uncertain. Together with the challenges of the existing meteorological system, this uncertainty suggests a more detailed analysis possibly including the development of a regional climate model.

Water resources 
Jordan's Second National Communication suggests that the rising temperatures will lead to a decrease in surface runoff at least in the two river basins Zarqa and Yarmouk which were chosen as pilot study areas. If the temperature rises by 2 °C, even an increase in precipitation by 20% would not compensate the increase in evaporation resulting in a decrease of surface runoff.

Given that situation, it is likely that climate change will lead to even more water scarcity in Jordan. Moreover, more intense precipitation is likely to affect the country. In detail, the following impacts are likely:

 Increasing water demand caused by warmer climate
 Reduction of water quantity in reservoirs
 Decreasing groundwater tables
 Deterioration of water quality caused by increasing water scarcity
 Conflicts among user groups (agriculture vs. domestic supply, industry, tourism)
 Damages through intense precipitation
 More Droughts and Heat Waves
National water and sanitation policies and strategies are formulated by the Ministry of Water and Irrigation (MWI) and need to be approved by the Council of Ministers. The ministry includes the Water Authority of Jordan (WAJ), which is responsible for water and sanitation service provision either directly or through its subsidiaries. In the Jordan Rift Valley, water and sanitation are managed by the Jordan Valley Authority (JVA). In 2009, climate change was not a main issue on the Jordanian water agenda. Jordan's Water Strategy 2008-2022 acknowledges that water scarcity will increase in the future. However, climate change plays a secondary role as driver of increasing water stress in the Water Strategy.

According to its Water Strategy, Jordan is one of the four driest countries in the world. Due to rapid population growth, water availability per capita has declined significantly, from 3,600 m³ per capita and year in 1946 to only 145 m³ in 2008. Water demand distinctly exceeds supply. Almost two thirds (64%) of the water is supplied for irrigation, while municipal use accounts for 30%, industry for 5% and tourism for 1%. In order to overcome the water crisis, the Jordanian Water Strategy focuses on demand management and an increase in water supply through the utilization of treated wastewater, the exploitation of the non renewable Disi aquifer and a canal from the Red Sea to the Dead Sea.

Impacts on people

Economic impacts

Agriculture 
Jordan's agricultural sector is particularly threatened by climate change and its impacts since it is the largest water user in Jordan. Climate change does not change the challenges in Jordan, which are mainly related to water scarcity. Instead, it is another factor contributing to aggravate the existing shortage, adding to the rapid population growth.

Mitigation and adaptation

Possible adaptation activities 
Adaptation measures in Jordan include a wide range of activities targeting water scarcity. Since water is already scarce in the Hashemite Kingdom, and not only threatened by climate change, all these activities can be categorized as no-regret measures, which make also sense even in the complete absence of the projected climate change. Activities which are directly targeting climate change are mostly limited to research activities.

No-Regret Measures 

All activities which contribute to minimize the gap between water availability and demand can be categorized as no-regret activities. This includes activities concerning water quality, if it is threatened through decreasing water availability. Even though Jordan's Water Strategy does not explicitly address climate change, it suggests numerous activities which also contribute to adapt Jordan's water sector to climate change. The following list includes possible activities:

 Activities concerning water quality, e.g. groundwater protection
 Reuse of treated wastewater (for green spaces)
 Improvement of water quality, e.g. water treatment

Domestic water supply:
 Water loss reduction
 Introduction of water saving technologies like low-flow toilets and showers

Agriculture
 Irrigation efficiency, e.g. through water saving technologies
 Introduction of new crop varieties (cash crops)
 (Micro) insurance solutions, e.g. for the case of crop shortfall
 Desalination of brackish water
 Reuse of treated wastewater
 Rainwater harvesting

Institutional adaptation activities include the following
 Increased water metering
 Reform of water pricing
 Promotion of water saving through awareness campaigns

Climate Justified Measures 
Activities which directly target climate change mainly concern research activities.
 Support of meteorological monitoring system
 Regional and sectoral studies on vulnerability
 Investigation and prioritization of adaptation alternatives
 Early warning systems for upcoming droughts
 Education, awareness campaigns on climate change, its impacts and adaptation

Existing adaptation activities 
The program “Adaptation to Climate Change to Sustain Jordan’s Millennium Development Goal Achievements” connects climate change adaptation with the MDGs. It is implemented jointly by UNDP, WHO, FAO and UNESCO and financed by the MDG Achievement Fund which is in turn financed by the Government of Spain (US$4 billion), SIWI and UNDP Jordan (about US$127,000). Besides the MoE, national key partners include the ministries of health, agriculture and education.

The program addresses challenges caused by climate-related water scarcity, including food security, health protection and access to improved water sources. The program has a rather institutional approach and a focus on stakeholder participation. Activities include training and capacity building, the development of an adequate policy and legal framework and public awareness campaigns. The Zarqa Governorate serves as a pilot area, in which the adaptive capacity of vulnerable communities is strengthened. The programme started in 2008 and was expected to end in 2010.

The program includes numerous no-regret activities like the upgrade of the national drinking water quality system. However, many activities directly target adaptation to climate change, for instance through the development of adaptation options.

Since climate change will exacerbate the existing water scarcity in Jordan, it is advised to further implement activities with the objective to increase supply and reduce demand. These approaches significantly contribute to adapt Jordan's population to climate change. Innovative measures include wastewater reuse and desalination of brackish water.

It is further recommended to accompany these activities with measures directly targeting climate change. According to Jordan's Second National Communication to the UNFCCC, the meteorological and hydrological monitoring systems leave room for improvement. Moreover, the development of vulnerability studies is a viable option. Other possible accompanying activities include an improved drought warning system and approaches with the objective to minimize the existing uncertainty of climate projections.

International cooperation 
Jordan signed the United Nations Framework Convention on Climate Change (UNFCCC) in 1992 and ratified it in 1993. The main focal point for climate change issues in Jordan is the Ministry of Environment (MoE). With support of UNDP and the Global Environment Facility (GEF), it published Jordan's Second National Communication to the UNFCCC in 2009, relying on the knowledge of numerous Jordanian experts. Jordan issued a national climate change policy in 2013, led by the ministry of environment.

See also 
 Climate change in the Middle East and North Africa
Water supply and sanitation in Jordan
 Renewable energy in Jordan

References 

Water supply and sanitation in Jordan
Environment of Jordan
Jordan
Climate change adaptation